PCB Blasters are a Pakistani women's cricket team that compete in the Pakistan Women's One Day Cup and the PCB Women's Twenty20 Tournament. The team has no geographical base, instead being made up of some of the best players from across Pakistan. They are captained by Fatima Sana and coached by Mohtashim Rasheed. They have won one one-day tournament, in 2019–20, and one Twenty20 tournament, in 2022–23.

History
PCB Blasters were formed in 2018, ahead of the 2017–18 PCB Triangular One Day Women's Tournament. They were captained by Nahida Khan. They finished bottom of the group, winning one of their four matches. However, Blasters batter Kainat Imtiaz was the leading run-scorer in the competition, and Blaster bowler Ghulam Fatima was the leading wicket-taker. The following season, 2018–19, Blasters, captained by Rameen Shamim, topped the group with three wins from four matches. However, they lost the final to PCB Dynamites by 12 runs. Blasters batter Aliya Riaz was the leading run-scorer in the tournament, whilst Blasters players Diana Baig, Aliya Riaz and Rameen Shamim were three of the five bowlers joint as leading wicket-takers.

In 2019–20, PCB Blasters also competed in a new competition, the PCB Triangular Twenty20 Women's Tournament. They finished second in the group stage of the T20 tournament, but lost to PCB Challengers in the final by 6 wickets. In the one-day competition, however, Blasters won their first title, again finishing second in the group stage but defeating PCB Challengers in the final, helped by 102* from tournament leading run-scorer Sidra Ameen.

In 2020–21, only the T20 tournament was played. PCB Blasters finished bottom of the group, losing three of their four matches, with one abandoned. In 2021–22 the side competed in the newly renamed Pakistan Women's One Day Cup, captained by Sidra Nawaz. Blasters won five of their six matches in the group stage, qualifying for the final where they lost to PCB Challengers by 68 runs. In 2022–23, the side won their first T20 tournament, beating PCB Dynamites in the final by 7 runs.

Players

Current squad
Based on squad for the 2022–23 season. Players in bold have international caps.

Seasons

Pakistan Women's One Day Cup

PCB Women's Twenty20 Tournament

Honours
 Pakistan Women's One Day Cup:
 Winners (1): 2019–20
 PCB Women's Twenty20 Tournament:
 Winners (1): 2022–23

References

Women's cricket teams in Pakistan
2018 establishments in Pakistan